is an eroge visual novel developed by Milk Soft for Windows. The Sega Dreamcast version removes the pornographic elements, but features new CG scenes, added content, and a bonus drama CD.

Notes

I: The choice of kanji here implies a subtle distinction, as there are at least three kanji for the word uta: 歌, 唄, and 詩. While all three mean 'song', they have their own connotations. The use of the 唄 kanji implies a song that includes a shamisen.

External links
Page at Sega Direct for the Dreamcast port. 

2002 video games
Bishōjo games
Dreamcast games
Eroge
Japan-exclusive video games
Video game remakes
Video games developed in Japan
Visual novels
Windows games